Zorion is a genus of longhorn beetle that is endemic to New Zealand. About 10 species are currently recognized.

Distribution 

Zorion is widespread throughout the North Island and South Island of New Zealand.

Taxonomy 
 Z. minutum
 Z. guttigerum/Z. castum
Z. opacum
Z. batesi
Z. angustifasciatum
Z. australe
Z. dugdalei
Z. kaikouraiensis
Z. nonmaculatum
Z. taranakiensis

References 

Cerambycidae
Beetles of New Zealand
Endemic fauna of New Zealand
Endemic insects of New Zealand